Pulsar MTV Stuntmania is India's first stunt biking reality show. Indian television witnessed this thrill and street stunting for the first time in September 2009. The last Show was hosted by VJ Rannvijay Singh.

Hosts
 Season 1 - Allan Amin and Deepti Gujral
 Season 2 - Allan Amin and Anushka Manchanda
 Season 3 - VJ Rannvijay

References 

Indian reality television series
MTV (Indian TV channel) original programming
2009 Indian television series debuts
2011 Indian television series endings